Colette Le Moal (born March 27, 1932 in Paris) is a member of the National Assembly of France.  She represents the Yvelines department, and is a member of the New Centre.

References

1932 births
Living people
Politicians from Paris
The Centrists politicians
Deputies of the 13th National Assembly of the French Fifth Republic
Women members of the National Assembly (France)
21st-century French women politicians
Mayors of places in Île-de-France